Buckeye Chuck, Ohio's official weather-predicting groundhog, resides in Marion, Ohio. He is one of two whistlepigs (another name for groundhogs) in Ohio known for predicting the arrival of spring on Groundhog Day (February 2). A native of Ohio, Chuck began predicting the arrival of spring in the 1970s. In addition, the Ohio General Assembly declared Buckeye Chuck the official State Groundhog in 1979. However, from 2006 to 2015, Chuck's forecast was correct only twice. 

According to the legend of Groundhog Day, the groundhog's behavior is a way of forecasting the weather. If the groundhog pops out from its burrow, sees his shadow, and then disappears again, it will mean that winter is to continue for six more weeks. But if the groundhog does not see its shadow, then it will not be scared to come out of its burrow and winter will soon end.

Past predictions

See also
Balzac Billy
Fred la marmotte
General Beauregard Lee
Punxsutawney Phil
Shubenacadie Sam
Staten Island Chuck
Stormy Marmot
Wiarton Willie

References

External links
ohiohistorycentral.org - Ohio History Central: Buckeye Chuck

Individual groundhogs
Holiday characters
Oracular animals
Individual animals in the United States
Marion, Ohio
Ohio culture
Groundhog Day